Rescue Heroes is a Canadian animated television series produced by Nelvana. Based on the Fisher-Price toy line of the same name, the television series tracks the adventures of a team of emergency responders who rescue people from various disasters.

The series premiered in Canada on Teletoon on October 2, 1999, and ran for three seasons. On November 18, 2003, a film titled Rescue Heroes: The Movie was released, but became a final episode for the series. In the U.S., the series aired on both CBS, as part of the CBS Kidshow from 1999 to 2000; and The WB, as part of Kids' WB, from 2001 to 2003. Repeats aired on Qubo in 2009 until it ceased in 2021.

Overview
Rescue Heroes focuses on a group of rescue personnel who aim to save lives around the world from both natural and man-made disasters.

The headquarters, also known as the Mountain Action Command Center, is where team leader Billy Blazes, along with team members Wendy Waters, Jake Justice, Jack Hammer, Ariel Flyer, and Rocky Canyon, reside. Calls for help come into the command center through Warren Waters, the director and chief dispatcher of the Rescue Heroes.

The television series aims to show how to handle emergency situations, as well as how to deal with personal issues, such as disagreements. At the end of most episodes the Rescue Heroes would give safety tips and discuss how to handle the conflict presented in the episode. The episode would then usually conclude with the motto "Think like a Rescue Hero, think safe."

Characters

Main
 Billy Blazes (voiced by Norm Spencer) - Billy, a Canadian firefighter hailing from Quebec, is the leader of the Rescue Heroes who helped choose the other members of the team. He has a younger brother named Bobby, as well as a father. Billy had an uneasy relationship with his father. This was because Bobby chose to become a firefighter like Billy, instead of being a construction worker like his father. It was revealed in the episode "Flashback to Danger" that Billy was chosen to be a Rescue Hero after saving a group of children trapped in a carnival ride that was set ablaze.
 Wendy Waters (voiced by Lenore Zann) - Wendy, a firefighter, is effectively the second-in-command. Her father, Warren, is a Rescue Hero who works at a space station. It was through a news report about a factory being set ablaze that lead to her being chosen to try out for the Rescue Heroes.
 Jake Justice (voiced by Martin Roach) - Jake, a police officer, was chosen to try out for the Rescue Heroes when he caught a wanted criminal after a televised car chase that made national headlines. It is revealed in the revival that he has a daughter named Sky Justice.
 Richmond "Rocky" Canyon (voiced by Joseph Motiki) - Rocky, a mountain climbing specialist, is the youngest member of the Rescue Heroes. When Billy had once considered quitting the Rescue Heroes it was ultimately Rocky, through an audition video, who convinced him to stay, cementing Billy's decision to hire Rocky. The episode "Twister" revealed that his hometown is in Oklahoma, and that his father had died.
 Ariel Flyer (voiced by Lisa Messinger in season one, Deborah Odell in seasons two and three) - Ariel, a bilingual flight and wildlife specialist, was once a stunt pilot who had a rival named Avery Ator. However, Avery's lack of concern for safety has led to Ariel rescuing him on two occasions.
 Jack Hammer (voiced by Rod Wilson) - Jack, a construction worker hailing from Texas, was originally a contractor hired to build the Rescue Heroes' base of operations, but had saved a fellow construction worker in a crane accident. Because of this, he was given the opportunity to try out for the Rescue Heroes. Jack has a younger sister named Jill, who is a member of the Texas Fire Brigade.

Minor
 Aiden Assist (voiced by)- Paramedic.
 Al Pine (voiced by Edward Glen) - Arctic Rescue Specialist, with his St. Bernard, Windchill.
 Ben Choppin (voiced by Robert Bockstael) - Lumberjack.
 Bill Barker (voiced by Kent Sheridan) - Ground Patrol Specialist and K-9 Unit.
 Bob Buoy - Scuba Diver and Submarine Operator.
 Bob Sled (voiced by Andrew Sabiston) - Arctic Rescue Specialist and Snowmobile Operator.
 Brandon Irons - Cowboy.
 Captain Cuffs (voiced by) - Police Officer.
 Cliff Hanger (voiced by Adrian Hough) - Birdwing Operator and Hang glider.
 Gil Gripper (voiced by Paul Essiembre) - Scuba Diver and Jet Ski Operator.
 Hal E. Copter (voiced by Tony Daniels) - Heli-pack Operator.
 Kenny Ride (voiced by Richard Yearwood) - Bicycle Police Officer.
 Matt Medic (voiced by Andrew Pifko) - Physician.
 Maureen Biologist (voiced by Jane Luk) - Ocean Rescue Specialist and Safety Diver.
 Pat Pending (voiced by Donald Burda) - Chief Equipment Designer of the Rescue Heroes.
 Perry Chute (voiced by James Rankin) - Parachuter.
 Rip Rockefeller (voiced by Cathal J. Dodd) - Construction Worker and Mountaineer.
 Rock Miner - Safety Spelunker.
 Roger Houston (voiced by Christopher Earle) - Astronaut and Communications Officer.
 Sam Sparks (voiced by Vince Corazza) - Firefighter.
 Sandy Beach (voiced by Jesse Collins) - Lifeguard and Surfing Specialist.
 Sergeant Siren (voiced by Dean McDermott) - Police Sergeant.
 Seymour Wilde (voiced by Cedric Smith) - Animal Wrangler.
 Warren Waters (voiced by John Bourgeois) - Director and Chief Dispatcher; also the father of Wendy Waters.
 Willy Stop (voiced by Paul Haddad) - Traffic Officer and Crowd Control Specialist.

Series overview

Episodes

Pilot (1998)

Season 1 (1999–2000)
This is the only season to use cel animation.

Season 2 (2001)
This is the first season to use digital ink-and-paint animation.

Season 3 (2002)
This is the last season to use digital ink-and-paint animation.

Revival

On April 16, 2019, Fisher-Price revived the Rescue Heroes series exclusively for YouTube. Each five minute episode aired on Fisher-Price's YouTube channel.

The revival introduced several new characters while maintaining two characters from the original TV show - Billy Blazes and Rocky Canyon.

Characters

Main
 Billy Blazes (Jason Paquettee) - The team leader of the Rescue Heroes. Billy hails from Quebec.
 Carlos Kitbash (Patrick Pedraza) - A rescue cadet, who is also a mechanic, that hails from Cuba.
 Forrest Fuego (Giorgio Cavalli) - A fire rescue cadet hailing from Colombia. His favorite sport is soccer.
 Reed Vitals (Peter Kim) - A medical rescue cadet hailing from South Korea.
 Richmond "Rocky" Canyon (Wellington Saygbay) - No longer the rookie, Rocky, a mountain climbing specialist, is now a Mountain Rescue Hero.
 Sandy O'Shin (Stephanie McKeon Riabko) - A water rescue cadet hailing from Ireland.
 Sky Justice (Nzinga Blake) - An air rescue cadet hailing from Nigeria; she is the daughter of former Rescue Heroes member Jake Justice.
 Al Valanche - A seasoned snowboarder hailing from France. He has a pet lynx named Claws.
 A.R.I.N (Katherin Kennard) - The artificial intelligence of the Rescue Heroes who gives them their missions.

Episodes

Telecast and home media
Rescue Heroes premiered in Canada on Teletoon on October 2, 1999, until its final episode (as a film) aired on November 18, 2003. It ran for three seasons. In the U.S., the series aired on both CBS, as part of the CBS Kidshow from 1999 to 2000; and Kids' WB, from 2001 to 2003. Repeats aired on Qubo in 2009 until it ceased in 2021. It also briefly aired on Cartoon Network in 2004. 

In the 2000s, Fisher-Price released all volumes on VHS with the episode "Lava Alarm", Fisher-Price released volumes on DVD under the title "Adventure Collection".

As of 2022, the series is now streaming on Tubi.

References

External links
 
 Nelvana's profile on the TV series

1990s Canadian animated television series
2000s Canadian animated television series
1999 Canadian television series debuts
2003 Canadian television series endings
Canadian children's animated action television series
Canadian children's animated adventure television series
Canadian children's animated superhero television series
CBS original programming
English-language television shows
Kids' WB original shows
Teletoon original programming
Television series by Nelvana
Television shows based on Mattel toys